Yussuf Yassin Saleh (born 22 March 1984) is an Ethiopian footballer who plays as a left winger for Rinkeby United.

Yussuf was originally an attacking midfielder but later a left-winger. He has previously played for Hässelby SK FF, Vasalunds IF, Ciudad de Murcia and AIK.

Career
Yussuf was playing in the Swedish third tier with Vasalunds IF when he was signed by Stockholm club AIK in the summer of 2008. He made his Allsvenskan debut against IF Elfsborg on 10 August that same year. Yussuf became Swedish champion with AIK in 2009, but the following year he was sent out on loan to nearby Superettan club Syrianska FC because he needed to play more games to continue his development. During his loan, Yussuf helped the club get promoted to Allsvenskan for the first time ever and the next year he returned on loan to play with them again, this time at the highest level of the Swedish football league system. After his contract with AIK expired he signed a one-year deal with Syrianska for the 2012 season. In 2013, he completed a transfer to Kazakhstan side FC Tobol.On 1 August. 2017 he join his old club Vasalunds IF.

International career
Yussuf was born in Sweden to Ethiopian parents and in 2012 he was called in to represent Ethiopia in the 2012 edition of CECAFA hosted in Uganda. He was named in the Ethiopian squad for the 2013 Africa Cup of Nations.

Honours

AIK 
 Allsvenskan: 2009
 Svenska Cupen: 2009
 Supercupen: 2010

References

External links

 at aikfotboll.se 

Yussuf Saleh at Fotbolltransfers

1984 births
Living people
People from Solna Municipality
Swedish footballers
Ethiopian footballers
Ethiopia international footballers
Vasalunds IF players
Ciudad de Murcia footballers
AIK Fotboll players
Syrianska FC players
FC Tobol players
Allsvenskan players
Superettan players
Kazakhstan Premier League players
Ethiopian expatriate footballers
Expatriate footballers in Spain
Expatriate footballers in Sweden
Expatriate footballers in Kazakhstan
2013 Africa Cup of Nations players
IK Sirius Fotboll players
AFC Eskilstuna players
Association football midfielders
Sportspeople from Stockholm County